Deccani Architecture refers to the architectural styles developed during the Deccan sultanate period. The Deccan sultanates were five dynasties that ruled late medieval kingdoms, namely, Bijapur, Golkonda, Ahmadnagar, Bidar, and Berar in south-western India. The Deccan sultanates were located on the Deccan Plateau. Their architecture was a regional variant of Indo-Islamic architecture, heavily influenced by the styles of the Delhi Sultanate and later Mughal architecture, but sometimes also directly from Persia and Central Asia.

The rulers of five Deccan sultanates had a number of cultural contributions to their credit in the fields of art, music, literature and architecture. Deccan sultanates have constructed many grand and impregnable forts. Bidar and Golconda forts are classic example of military planning of Deccan sultanates. Apart from forts, they have constructed many tombs, mosques and madrasas. Gol Gumbaz (tomb of Mohammed Adil Shah), was the second largest dome in the world.

In 2014, UNESCO put a group of buildings on its "tentative list" to become a World Heritage Site under the name Monuments and Forts of the Deccan Sultanate (despite there being a number of different sultanates). These are:
Bahmani Monuments at Gulbarga, Karnataka                            
Bahmani and Barid Shahi Monuments at Bidar, Karnataka      
Adil Shashi Monuments at Bijapur, Karnataka                            
Qutb Shahi Monuments at Hyderabad, Telangana

Ahmadnagar
A number of palaces such as the Farah Bakhsh Bagh, Hasht Bihisht Bagh, and Manjarsumbah are in and around Ahmadnagar city. There exist tombs of nobles like Salabat Khan and Changiz Khan, and also of saints like Shah Sharif and Bava Bangali.

Bidar
Bidar is famous for Bidar Fort, Mahmud Gawan Madrasa, the Bahmani Tombs at Ashtur and the Barid Shahi tombs.

Bidar Fort is one of the grandest fort in India. It has six-mile long wall made of huge stone blocks of reddish laterite stone. The fort contains many palaces and two large mosques, the Jami Masjid and the Solha Khumba Masjid.  The Ashtur tomb complex contains 12 tombs of Bahmani rulers out of which the tomb of Ahmad Shah I Wali has a large dome. Madrasa of Mahmud Gawana is one of the most beautiful Madrasa created by the Deccan sultanate. The tomb of Ali Barid Shah I contains s Persian charbagh garden.

Bijapur

The most remarkable monuments in Bijapur are the Gol Gumbaz and Ibrahim Rouza. Gol Gumbaz is the tomb of Mohammed Adil Shah and it contains the second largest dome in the world constructed before modern age. The external diameter of the hemispherical dome is 44 m. Ibrahim Rouza is the tomb for Ibrahim Adil Shah II and it is one of the most beautiful monument in Bijapur.

The Jami Masjid is one of the finest mosques in India having courtyard of 11,000 square feet. Other important architectural works of this period in Bijapur are the Chini Mahal, Jal Mandir, Sat Manzil, Gagan Mahal, Anand Mahal and the Asar Mahal (1646).

Golkonda

The most remarkable achievements of the Qutb Shahi dynasty is Golkonda fort. It is one of the most impregnable fort in India. It is also famous for its acoustic features and water management.

The Jami Masjid (1518) built by Quli Qutb Mulk is a notable mosque in Golkonda. The tombs of Qutb Shahis are a mausoleum complex, a royal necropolis of 30 tombs of the royal family. These were erected from 1543 to 1672.

Char Minar, in the heart of Hyderabad, was completed in 1591. It has four minarets of 56 m. height. The construction of the Makkah Masjid was started in 1617 during the reign of Muhammad Qutb Shah but completed only in 1693.

Gulbarga

Gulbarga was the initial capital of Bahamani sultanate. It has Shah Bazar Masjid, Gulbarga Fort and Great Mosque, in the Fort and the Haft Gumbad complex.

References

External links
Monuments of Deccan Sultanates and other Islamic Monuments of India

Monuments and memorials in Telangana
Buildings and structures in Bijapur district
Monuments and memorials in Karnataka
Buildings and structures in Telangana
Tourist attractions in Telangana
Buildings and structures in Bidar district
Tourist attractions in Bidar district
Architecture in India
Deccan sultanates